The Sacramento State Hornets (also Sac State) represent California State University, Sacramento in Sacramento, the capital city of the U.S. state of California, in intercollegiate athletics. The school fields 21 teams including men and women's basketball, cross country, golf, rowing, soccer, tennis, and track and field; women's-only gymnastics, beach volleyball, volleyball, and softball; and men's-only baseball and football. The Hornets compete in NCAA Division I, and are members of the Big Sky Conference. The men's soccer and women's beach volleyball teams play as affiliate members in the Big West Conference, the baseball team plays as an affiliate member in the Western Athletic Conference, and the women's rowing team is an affiliate of the American Athletic Conference.

Nickname
The Sacramento State official team nickname is the "Hornets."

History

Division II and Division III
The university has achieved multiple national championships as a Division III and Division II school. The school has also been a National Runner-up 8 times including Softball in 1989 (D-II), Women's Volleyball in 1979 and 1989 (D-II), Baseball in 1988 (D-II), Women's Track and Field in 1981 (AIAW D-II), Men's Cross Country in 1979 (D-II), Football in 1964 (CDN), and Men's Basketball (1962 CDN). Prior to AIAW softball division classifications, the softball team played in two Women's College World Series in 1976 and 1977.

Move to FBS level sports
During 2010–2014 NCAA conference realignment, there was speculation that the Hornets' Athletic department would like to move the football team to the Football Bowl Subdivision (FBS) due to the population base of Sacramento (Ranked 20th largest in college sports), the (enrollment) size of the university and the attractiveness of recruiting in the Sac-Joaquin Section. During realignment, the WAC had shown interest in adding Sacramento State as a member. To make the move to the FBS, the school needed to add an additional sport for women in order to meet the criteria of Title IX and also needed to fund a new sports complex for men's and women's basketball and volleyball because their arena was inadequate for FBS level sports and severely outdated (crowd capacity of 1012 persons). Sacramento State was unable to fund a massive facility upgrade for their athletic facilities (including basketball/volleyball, football, baseball and softball among others) in order to move to the FBS due to economic reasons and resistance from students and faculty members because of increasing tuition and overall cost. To become an FBS member, the football program would have been required to have an attendance average of 15,000 each season and the athletic department needed to increase overall funds for their athletic programs. On June 6, 2011, Big Sky Commissioner Doug Fullerton announced that "We're in a better place than the WAC is.", marking an end of the athletic department's attempt to move to FBS level sports during that period.

Sports sponsored
All varsity teams representing California State University, Sacramento compete in the Big Sky Conference except baseball (Western Athletic Conference), gymnastics (Mountain Pacific Sports Federation), rowing (American Athletic Conference), and women's beach volleyball and men's soccer (Big West Conference).

Baseball

The Sacramento State Hornets baseball team is the varsity intercollegiate baseball team of California State University, Sacramento. The team plays its home games at John Smith Field.

Notable baseball players for the Sacramento State Hornets include:

Cuno Barragan
Erik Bennett
Fred Besana
Keith Brown
Leon Brown
Scott Burcham
Roland de la Maza
Patrick Edwards
Mike Fischlin
Jack Heron
Rhys Hoskins
Mitch Lively
Buck Martinez
Matt Myers
Ron Stone
La Schelle Tarver
Tim Wheeler
Gary Wilson

Basketball

Men's basketball

The Sacramento State Hornets men's basketball team represents California State University, Sacramento. The team plays its home games at the Hornets Nest.

Women's basketball

The Sacramento State Hornets women's basketball team represents California State University, Sacramento. The team plays its home games at the Hornets Nest.

Women's beach volleyball
The Sacramento State Hornets women's beach volleyball team participates in the Big West Conference. They have played their home games at Livermore Community Park since 2016 while previously playing at the Sacramento Softball Complex since the team's founding in 2013.

Cross country
The men's and women's cross country teams participate in the Big Sky Conference. They host their home meets at the Haggin Oaks Golf Complex.

Football

The Sacramento State Hornets football program began in 1954, coached by Dave Strong (The teams' first football head coach). The programs' first victory came in the second season, 1955, where the Hornets defeated Southern Oregon by a point, which was also their only win of the season(they were winless in their first season of football). Sacramento State Football first affiliated with the Northern California Athletic Conference (NCAC) from 1962 until 1972, where they were added to the Western Football Conference (WFC) from 1973 to 1985, then becoming part of the D-1AA American West Conference (AWC). In 1996, Sac State was added to the Big Sky Conference along with Portland State, becoming the first California school in the Big Sky. Hornet Stadium has been home to the football team since 1969.

The team has never been ranked in any major polls by the end of all their past seasons, but have won 4 conference titles: 1964 and 1966-NCAC, 1986-WFC, and 1995-AFC. The Hornets football team participated in 2 bowls, the Pasadena Bowl in 1968 against Grambling State, where the Hornets lost 7-34, and the Camellia Bowl in 1964 (1964 College Division National Runner-up), where Montana State Bobcats defeated the Hornets 28–7.

Current successOne of Sac State's most notable wins came on September 3, 2011, in the season opener for both Sac State and Oregon State Beavers of the Pac-12 conference at Reser Stadium. The Hornets upset the Beavers in OT 29–28 with a 2-point conversion pass from QB Jeff Flemming to WR Brandyn Reed, beating an AQ Conference team for the first time in school history in front of an announced crowd of 41,581. The Beavers were a 23-point favorite coming into the game.

On September 8, 2012, the Hornets repeated the feat of defeating a Pac-12, upsetting the Colorado Buffaloes by a score 30–28 in Boulder in front of a crowd of 46,843. The Buffaloes were heavily favored in the match up. Walk-on Edgar Castaneda was awarded a full scholarship following his game-winning field goal.

Rivalry
In all sports, the university has a rivalry with the University of California, Davis due to close proximity. The rivalry football game is called the Causeway Classic and is played for the Causeway Carriage, referring to the schools' connection by the long Yolo Causeway bridge over the Yolo Bypass floodway. More recently, the rivalry was officially expanded to include all sports the teams compete in. UC Davis leads the series 40 to 18 with no ties. This game has drawn crowds up to 18,000 in the Hornet Stadium, and is widely popular in the local area. Sacramento State's second main rival is CSU's sister school Cal Poly (SLO). The game is called the “Green and Gold” game for the similarities in color of the two school. Other notable rivalries includes Portland State, Eastern Washington, Weber State, and conference powers Montana State University and the University of Montana.

Past Hornets drafted in the NFL
Many Hornets have been drafted directly into the NFL onto teams such as the San Francisco 49ers, Minnesota Vikings, Seattle Seahawks, Philadelphia Eagles and the New England Patriots.

Soccer

Men's soccer
The Sacramento State Hornets men's soccer team have an NCAA Division I Tournament record of 2–2 through two appearances.

Women's soccer
The Sacramento State Hornets women's soccer team have an NCAA Division I Tournament record of 0–2 through two appearances.

Track and field

Indoor
The Sacramento State Hornets women's indoor track and field team appeared in the NCAA Division I Tournament one time, with that appearance being 56th place in the 2009–10 school year. The Sacramento State Hornets men's indoor track and field team never made the NCAA Division I Tournament.

Women's volleyball
The Sacramento State Hornets women's volleyball team have an NCAA Division I Tournament record of 2–10 through ten appearances.

Championships

Team national championships
Sacramento State has never won a national championship at the NCAA Division I level.

Sacramento State won 1 national championship at the NCAA Division II level.
 Women's volleyball: 1981

Below are three national championships that were not bestowed by the NCAA:
 Women's golf – Division III (AIAW): 1981
 Softball – Division II (AIAW): 1981
 Women's volleyball – Division III (AIAW): 1980

Below are five national club team championships:
 Women's racquetball (USRA): 1986, 1987, 1988, 1989
 Men's rugby – Division II (USA Rugby): 2000

Note: Those with no denoted division is assumed that the institution earned a national championship at the highest level.

Team tournament appearances
The Sacramento State Hornets competed in the NCAA Tournament across 12 active sports (5 men's and 7 women's) 55 times at the Division I FCS level.
Football (3): 2019, 2021, 2023
Baseball (3): 2014, 2017, 2019
Women's basketball (1): 2023
Women's gymnastics (4): 1999, 2006, 2007, 2008
Men's soccer (2): 2009, 2010
Women's soccer (2): 2007, 2010
Softball (4): 1993, 1995, 2008, 2018
Men's tennis (10): 1999, 2001, 2002, 2003, 2007, 2009, 2010, 2011, 2012, 2013
Women's tennis (13): 2002, 2003, 2004, 2005, 2006, 2007, 2008, 2009, 2010, 2011, 2012, 2013, 2014
Women's volleyball (10): 1997, 1998, 1999, 2000, 2002, 2003, 2004, 2005, 2006, 2007
Women's indoor track and field (1): 2010
Men's outdoor track and field (2): 2006, 2013
Women's outdoor track and field (2): 1997, 2011

Individual national championships
Sacramento State had 3 Hornets win NCAA individual championships at the Division I Level.

At the NCAA Division II level, Sacramento State garnered 13 individual championships.

Conference championships
The university has accomplished 57 conference championships, the most occurring in the Big Sky. Including:
Football (Big Sky, 3 total): 2019, 2021, 2022
Women's Basketball (Big Sky, 1 total): 2023
Women's Volleyball (Big Sky, 11 total): 1997, 1998, 1999, 2000, 2001, 2002, 2003, 2004, 2005, 2006, 2007
Men's Tennis (Big Sky, 12 total): 1998, 1999, 2001, 2002, 2003, 2006, 2007, 2008, 2009, 2010, 2011, 2012
Women's Tennis (Big Sky, 11 total): 2002, 2003, 2004, 2005, 2006, 2007, 2008, 2009, 2010, 2011, 2012
Men's Golf (Big Sky, 5 total): 1996, 1997/2007 (Independent)/2008, 2012 (American Sky)
Women's Soccer (Big Sky, 2 total): 2007, 2010
Women's Golf (Big Sky, 1 total): 2007
Men's Indoor Track & Field (Big Sky, 3 total): 2007, 2008, 2011
Men's Outdoor Track & Field (Big Sky, 1 total): 2011
Women's Indoor Track & Field (Big Sky, 3 total): 2008, 2010, 2011
Women's Outdoor Track & Field (Big Sky, 5 total): 2008, 2009, 2010, 2011, 2012
Women's Gymnastics (Mountain Pacific, 6 total): 2002, 2003, 2005, 2014/2006, 2007 (WAC),
Men's Soccer (Mountain Pacific, 3 total): 2001, 2009, 2010
Softball (Pacific Coast, 1 total): 2008
Baseball: (WAC, 3 total): 2012, 2014, 2017
Women's Rowing (WIRAC, 5 total): 2000, 2001, 2006, 2007, 2009

Traditions

Sacramento State Marching Band

The Sacramento State Marching Band performs at home football games each fall, as well as at numerous other university functions and also periodically at high school band festivals. The Hornet Revue Pep Band is a subgroup of the marching band, and performs at all home basketball (men's and women's) and volleyball games. Both bands are under the direction of Santiago Sabado.

Fight song
"Fight, Hornet, Fight!" is the official fight song of California State University, Sacramento. It is most widely known for being played by the Sacramento State Marching Band after scores at Sacramento State football games, and during the band's pre-game and halftime shows. It is played after a touchdown, field goal, extra point, or a safety.

"Fight, Hornet, Fight!" is also played as the band forms a tunnel for the football team as they enter Hornet Stadium before the beginning of each home game. After every Hornet win, the football team comes over to the sideline where the band's section is and sings along while the song is being played.

"Fight, Hornet, Fight!" was composed by Don McDonald in 1949. McDonald graduated from Sacramento State in 1952. The current arrangement of the song was written by former Band Director Jeffrey Edom in 1997.

References

External links